Juiced may refer to:

 Juiced (video game), a racing video game
 Juiced (series), the subsequent series of games
 Juiced (book), a book by Jose Canseco noted for revealing the extent of steroid use in baseball
 Juiced.GS, a magazine for Apple II users
 Juiced with O.J. Simpson, a pay-per-view television program
 Juiced ball, a baseball altered to improving scoring potential
 Juiced fish or painted fish, an artificially-colored aquarium fish

See also
 Juice (disambiguation)
 Joost, a peer-to-peer video distribution system